Patnagarh (Sl. No.: 67) is a Vidhan Sabha constituency of Balangir district, Odisha.

This constituency includes Patnagarh, Patnagarh block, Belpara block and Khaprakhol block.

In 2009 election, Bharatiya Janata Party candidate Kanak Vardhan Singh Deo defeated Biju Janata Dal candidate Prakriti Devi Singh Deo by a margin of 19,382 votes.

Elected Members

Fifteen elections were held between 1951 and 2014.
Elected members from the Patnagarh constituency are:
2019: (67): Saroj Kumar Meher (BJD)
2014: (67): Kanak Vardhan Singh Deo (BJP)
2009: (67): Kanak Vardhan Singh Deo (BJP)
2004: (108): Kanak Vardhan Singh Deo (BJP) 
2000: (108): Kanak Vardhan Singh Deo (BJP)
1995: (108): Kanak Vardhan Singh Deo (BJP)
1990: (108): Bibekananda Meher (Janata Dal)
1985: (108): Sushil Kumar Prushty (Congress)
1980: (108): Brajamohan Thakur  (Congress-I)
1977: (108): Bibekananda Meher (Janata Party)
1974: (108): Ainthu Sahoo (Swatantra Party)
1971: (105): Ainthu Sahoo (Swatantra)
1967: (105): Ainthu Sahoo (Swatantra)
1961: (44): Sobhakar Bariha (Independent)
1957: (31): Asharam Bhoi  (Ganatantra Parishad) and Ainthu Sahoo (Ganatantra Parishad)
1951: (23): Arjun Das (Ganatantra Parishad) and Ganesh Ram Bariha (Ganatantra Parishad)

2019 Election result

2014 Election Result
In 2014 election, Bharatiya Janata Party candidate Kanak Vardhan Singh Deo defeated Biju Janata Dal candidate Prakriti Devi Singh Deo by a margin of 13,653 votes.

Summary of results of the 2009 Election

Notes

References

Balangir
Assembly constituencies of Odisha
Balangir district